Lucas Valley-Marinwood is a census-designated place (CDP) in Marin County, California, United States. It includes the neighborhoods of Lucas Valley and Marinwood. As of the 2020 census, the population was 6,259.

History

James Miller, of Irish descent, came overland to California in 1844 with the Stephens–Townsend–Murphy Party and in April 1845 arrived in San Rafael. In 1846 he purchased  of land from Timothy Murphy, grantee of Rancho San Pedro, Santa Margarita y Las Gallinas. The land encompassed present-day Marinwood and a creek which was later named Miller Creek. He rebuilt an old adobe on a hill where the Miller Creek condominiums are located and called it Miller Hall. By 1862 Miller had 10 children, and in he 1864 donated a -acre site next to Miller Creek to have the Dixie School built upon it. The building still stands but has been relocated in front of Miller Creek Middle school on Las Gallinas Avenue. It is on the National Register of Historic Places.

James Miller died in 1890. The  ranch he owned at the time was eventually sold to the Sequeira family in 1935. The family tore down Miller Hall later that year. A portion of the Miller land was sold to Anthony Faustine (A.F.) Silveira, who had leased the property from 1900 to 1935. Silveira built his own home and dairy facility in 1935 on the east side of what is now the 101 Highway. Silveira, the founding president of Marin Dairymen's Milk Co. Ltd. aka Marin-Dell, died in a ranch accident in 1937. His family continued the ranching operation, which still exists.

Lucas Valley was named after John Lucas, a 19th-century rancher and nephew of Timothy Murphy (not related to George Lucas).

In the 1950s and 1960s, suburbia came to Marinwood. It was brought partly on the shoulders of modernist builder/developer Joseph Eichler. His highly recognizable and stylish homes can be found throughout Lucas Valley and Eastern Marinwood. The Lucas Valley community center and pool were also constructed by Eichler as a centerpiece of the neighborhood.

The original subdivision of Marinwood consisted of streets to the north of Miller Creek Road and featured a blend of suburban single story ranch-style homes and two-story Cape Cod-inspired homes. The streets were named so that all the names ended in "-stone".  In alphabetical order, they are Adobestone, Blackstone, Cobblestone, Deepstone, Emerystone, Flagstone, Heatherstone, Johnstone, Millstone, Opalstone, Peachstone, Rhinestone, Unionstone, and Windstone.

The second subdivision was smaller, built to the south of Miller Creek Road, featuring the same mix of ranch- and Cape Cod-style homes. The streets were named with "-wood" as their suffix. They are Pinewood and Quietwood.

A later development was the area that became known as Lower Lucas Valley. This development featured the Eichler-style homes, as opposed to the Marinwood mix. The streets of lower Lucas Valley were named so their names all ended in berry. The streets are, in alphabetical order: Appleberry, Blackberry, Cedarberry, Danberry, Elderberry, Flaxberry, Greenberry, Huckleberry, Idylberry, Juniperberry, Kernberry, Loganberry, Mulberry, Newberry.

The final development was the area up the valley to the west, known as Upper Lucas Valley, and also featured Eichler-style homes. The streets of this area are all named for famous mountains, such as Mt. Shasta, Mt. Rainier, Mt. Whitney, etc.

Geographically, Skywalker Ranch is located on the western side of the Big Rock Ridge and is not part of the Lucas Valley–Marinwood CDP.

Geography
It is bordered to the north by Novato and to the south by San Rafael. The U.S. Route 101 freeway forms the eastern limit of the CDP, and Lucas Valley Road is the southern border. The CDP extends west up Lucas Valley road to the height of land at Big Rock.

Demographics

2010
The 2010 United States Census reported that Lucas Valley-Marinwood had a population of 6,094. The racial makeup of Lucas Valley-Marinwood was 5,225 (85.7%) White, 68 (1.1%) African American, 18 (0.3%) Native American, 424 (7.0%) Asian, 5 (0.1%) Pacific Islander, 117 (1.9%) from other races, and 237 (3.9%) from two or more races. Hispanic or Latino of any race were 444 persons (7.3%).

The Census reported that 6,011 people (98.6% of the population) lived in households, 54 (0.9%) lived in non-institutionalized group quarters, and 29 (0.5%) were institutionalized.

There were 2,348 households, out of which 809 (34.5%) had children under the age of 18 living in them, 1,395 (59.4%) were opposite-sex married couples living together, 222 (9.5%) had a female householder with no husband present, 84 (3.6%) had a male householder with no wife present.  There were 84 (3.6%) unmarried opposite-sex partnerships, and 35 (1.5%) same-sex married couples or partnerships. 521 households (22.2%) were made up of individuals, and 311 (13.2%) had someone living alone who was 65 years of age or older. The average household size was 2.56.  There were 1,701 families (72.4% of all households); the average family size was 2.97.

The population was spread out, with 1,455 people (23.9%) under the age of 18, 309 people (5.1%) aged 18 to 24, 1,055 people (17.3%) aged 25 to 44, 2,052 people (33.7%) aged 45 to 64, and 1,223 people (20.1%) who were 65 years of age or older.  The median age was 47.3 years. For every 100 females, there were 89.6 males.  For every 100 females age 18 and over, there were 85.2 males.

The homeowner vacancy rate was 0.7%; the rental vacancy rate was 4.9%.  5,121 people (84.0% of the population) lived in owner-occupied housing units and 890 people (14.6%) lived in rental housing units.

2000
As of the census of 2000, there were 6,357 people, 2,369 households, and 1,764 families, residing in the CDP. The racial makeup of the CDP in 2010 was 81.0% non-Hispanic White, 1.1% non-Hispanic African American, 0.1% Native American, 6.9% Asian, 0.1% Pacific Islander, 0.3% from other races, and 3.2% from two or more races. Hispanic or Latino of any race were 7.3% of the population.

There were 2,369 households, out of which 37.4% had children under the age of 18 living with them, 61.5% were married couples living together, 10.1% had a female householder with no husband present, and 25.5% were non-families. 19.9% of all households were made up of individuals, and 10.4% had someone living alone who was 65 years of age or older.  The average household size was 2.64 and the average family size was 3.03.

In the CDP, the population was spread out, with 26.6% under the age of 18, 3.6% from 18 to 24, 23.8% from 25 to 44, 30.2% from 45 to 64, and 15.8% who were 65 years of age or older.  The median age was 43 years. For every 100 females, there were 91.1 males.  For every 100 females age 18 and over, there were 84.4 males.

The median income for a household in the CDP was $85,444, and the median income for a family was $95,852. Males had a median income of $65,583 versus $51,132 for females. The per capita income for the CDP was $38,423.  About 2.0% of families and 3.7% of the population were below the poverty line, including 2.2% of those under age 18 and 6.3% of those age 65 or over.

Education
A major school district in Marinwood is the Dixie school District. It includes three elementary schools- Dixie Lions, and Mary E. Silveira Stars. There is also one middle school-Miller Creek Middle School Panthers, a California Distinguished School.

References

External links
 Lucas Valley Homeowners Association

See also
 Lucas Valley, the landform for which the community is named

Census-designated places in Marin County, California
Lucas Valley
Census-designated places in California